Hilbert van Nydeck Schenck, Jr. (February 12, 1926 – December 2, 2013) was an American science fiction writer and engineer. He taught at the University of Rhode Island.

Several of his short fiction works were nominated for Hugos and Nebulas. He also wrote several textbooks on engineering.

Award nominations

Hugo Awards
1980, Best Novella: "The Battle of the Abaco Reefs"
1984, Best Novella: "Hurricane Claude"
1984, Best Short Story: "The Geometry of Narrative"
1985, Best Novelette: "Silicon Muse"

Nebula Awards
1980, Best Novella: "The Battle of the Abaco Reefs" 
1984, Best Short story: "The Geometry of Narrative"

Bibliography

Novels
At the Eye of the Ocean (1981)
A Rose for Armageddon (1982)
Chronosequence (1988)

Short story collections
Wave Rider (1980)
 "Three Days at the End of the World" (1977)
 "The Battle of the Abaco Reefs" (1979)
 "Wave Rider" (1979)
 "Buoyant Ascent" (1980)
Steam Bird (1988)
 "Hurricane Claude" (1983)
 "Steam Bird" (1984)

Short stories
"Tomorrow's Weather" (1953)
"The Theology of Water" (1982)
"The Geometry of Narrative" (1953)
 "The Morphology of the Kirkham Wreck" (1978)
"Silicon Muse" (1984)
"Send Me a Kiss by Wire" (1985)
"Ring Shot" (1986)
"A Down East Storm" (1990)
"A Present for Santa" (1993)

References

External links
Partial bibliography

1926 births
2013 deaths
20th-century American novelists
American male novelists
American science fiction writers
University of Rhode Island faculty
American male short story writers
20th-century American short story writers
20th-century American male writers